Janko Mitrović (1613–1659) was a harambaša (Ottoman for "bandit leader"), and the commander of the Morlach army, in the service of the Republic of Venice, from 1648 until his death in 1659. He participated in the Cretan War (1645–69), alongside Ilija Smiljanić, as the supreme commanders of the Venetian Morlach troops, of which he is enumerated in Serb epic poetry (as Janko of Kotari, Јанко од Котара). His son, Stojan Janković, followed in his father's footsteps.

Life
Janko was the son of Mitar (born c. 1585), whose family hailed from village Zelengrad or Žegar in the area of Bukovica. Janko had brothers Jovan, Stjepan, Pavle, and Andrija, and probably was among the youngest brothers. Vukadin Mitrović was also a harambaša in Venetian service, possibly another brother, or a cousin.

Mitrović in 1646 was recorded as a defender of Šibenik, and in 1649 was rewarded with a monthly payment of 4 ducats. Stojan, who was Janko's eldest son, began fighting alongside him and Ilija Smiljanić early on, in the Cretan War (1645–69). Ilija, as the more experienced, was named serdar in 1648 after his father, serdar Petar Smiljanić had died. In 1648, when the Ottoman army took their village, the Mitrovići and 70 other Žegar families settled in the small village of Budin near Posedarje, under Venetian control. In January 1654, with 100 horsemen and 150 other soldiers prevented Ottoman's destruction of Posedarje for which was rewarded by the authorities. After the death of Filip Smiljanić, in 1656 was named as a serdar. Under his command were people of Ražanac, Vinjerac, Ljubač, Posedarje, Novigrad, Krmpoćani, as well controlled two cols at Old Obrovac

In February 1659, at the Cetina river, both leaders Janko and Ilija Smiljanić succumb to wounds after battling the Turks. He was buried on 28 February 1659 in the Catholic church of St. Elias in Zadar, until mid-18th century part of the Catholic župa of Zadar Cathedral in which register of deaths (1651–1667) was recorded. Janko's wife was Antonija, and they had three sons, Stojan, Ilija and Zaviša, and a daughter Ana. According to one document, stating that they had many people of the same confession faithful to the Roman Church, it is argued that they were Roman Catholics.

Notes

See also
Vuk Mandušić (fl. 1648), military commander in Venetian service
Stojan Janković (1636–1687), Morlach leader
Ilija Perajica, Morlach leader
Stanislav Sočivica, Venetian rebel
Sinobad
Cvijan Šarić
Petronije Selaković
Bajo Plivljanin
Grujica Žeravica
Vukosav Puhalović
Ilija Smiljanić
Petar Smiljanić
Vuk Močivuna
Juraj Vranić
Tadije Vranić

References

Sources

Rodoslov Jankovića i Desnica vid. Baština dvora Jankovića, Istorijski muzej Srbije, Beograd 2006, str. 92 (Serbian)

External links
http://www.kulajankovica.hr/?do=jandes

Characters in Serbian epic poetry
Republic of Venice military personnel
1613 births
1659 deaths
Cretan War (1645–1669)
Venetian period in the history of Croatia